The Buxoro Arena, which is part of the Buxoro Sport Majmuasi, is a multi-use stadium in Bukhara, Uzbekistan.  It is currently used mostly for football matches of FK Buxoro.

History
The stadium holds 22,700 people. It was built in 2002. 

In March 2012 Buxoro Sport Majmuasi stadium was renamed Buxoro Arena.

External links
 StadiumDB images

References

Football venues in Uzbekistan
Bukhara